The Cenél nÓengusa were a kin group who ruled the island of Islay, and perhaps nearby Colonsay, off the western coast of Scotland in the early Middle Ages.

The Senchus fer n-Alban, a census and genealogy of the kingdom of Dál Riata, lists the Cenél nÓengusa as one of the three kin groups making up the kingdom in Argyll. The others were the Cenél nGabráin of Kintyre and the Cenél Loairn of Lorn. A fourth group, the Cenél Comgaill, of Cowal and the Isle of Bute, later split from the Cenél nGabráin. The Senchus portrays Dál Riata as it existed in the mid-seventh century.

The Senchus traces the descent of the Cenél nÓengusa from Óengus Mór mac Eirc, brother of Fergus Mór, a relationship which is almost certainly an invention. The Cenél nÓengusa are the only kindred from which no historical kings of Dál Riata are recorded by the Irish annals.

Óengus Mór is said to have had two sons, Nadsluaig and Fergna, and their descendants are listed in the Senchus. It also lists the subdivisions of Islay, and the number of houses in each. The Cenél nÓengusa are listed among these, and thirty households only are attributed to them. As well as the descendants of Óengus, the Senchus places the Cenél Conchride, named for Conchriath, son of Bolc, son of Sétna, son of Fergus Bec, son of Erc, on Islay.

It has been suggested that Fergna son of Óengus Mór may be identified with Fergnae mac Oengusso Ibdaig, that is Fergnae son of Óengus the Hebridean. The descendants of this Fergnae, known as the Uí Ibdaig—the descendants of the Hebridean—were counted as a minor branch of the powerful Dál Fiatach of Ulster.

The Senchus states that the Cenél nÓengusa ruled over four hundred and thirty households, and that they were obliged to provide the overking of Dál Riata with two seven-bench ships for each twenty households on sea expeditions, and with five hundred fighting men on land expeditions.

The Genelaig Albanensium, a series of genealogies attached to Senchus proper, gives the ancestry of a certain Óengus. This calls him Óengus, son of Boib, son of Rónán, son of Áedán, son of C[h]abléni (the Senchus gives Capléne), son of Nadsluaig, son of Rónán, son of Óengus Mór mac Eirc. In this genealogy, Nadsluaig is a grandson of Óengus Mór, and not his son, otherwise the genealogy in the Senchus matches this as far as Áedán. Marjorie Ogilvie Anderson suggested that this genealogy dates from the early 8th century, as do those given for the other kindreds in the same source, and reflects a second census undertaken at about that time.

There are very few historical sources outwith the Senchus which refer to the Cenél nÓengusa. The late Tripartite Life of Saint Patrick refers to Patrick appointing a certain Ném as bishop of Telach in the lands of the Cenél nÓengusa.  Adomnán's hagiography of Columba mentions a rich Islay landowner named Feradach, but says nothing about the political background on the island.

References

 
 
 

Medieval Gaels from Scotland
Islay